Chusquea subulata   is a species of Chusquea bamboo in the grass family.

Synonyms 
There are no synonyms.

Distribution 
Chusquea subulata is endemic to Colombia and Ecuador.

Description 

The woody stem has a width of 70 to 80 millimeters and can grow upwards of 7 to 10 meters in height.

References 

subulata